Tegostoma subterminalis is a moth in the family Crambidae. It was described by Hugo Theodor Christoph in 1882. It is found in Azerbaijan.

References

Odontiini
Moths described in 1882
Moths of Asia
Taxa named by Hugo Theodor Christoph